The Khooldzin Svita is a geological formation in Mongolia whose strata date back to the Early Cretaceous. Dinosaur remains are among the fossils that have been recovered from the formation.

See also

 List of dinosaur-bearing rock formations

References

Geologic formations of Mongolia
Lower Cretaceous Series of Asia